Massimiliano Narducci (born 25 February 1964) is a former professional tennis player from Italy.

Narducci won his only tournament on the ATP Tour in 1988 at Florence. He also appeared in the singles draw of all four Grand Slams, making the second round in both Australia and France. In the Australian Open he defeated American player Mike Bauer in five sets. He met fifth seed Yannick Noah in the next round and took the first set off him, in a tiebreak, but then lost the next three sets. At the French Open he eliminated Joey Rive in the opening round, before losing to Andre Agassi.

In 1989 he put in some good doubles performances with his partner Omar Camporese. They reached the quarter finals at Monte Carlo and the semi finals in Milan. That year, Narducci also played two Davis Cup singles matches for the Italian team against Sweden. He lost both, in five setters, to Jonas Svensson / Mikael Pernfors.

Grand Prix career finals

Singles: 1 (1–0)

References

1964 births
Living people
Italian male tennis players
People from Ascoli Piceno
Sportspeople from the Province of Ascoli Piceno
20th-century Italian people